Mimapomecyna is a genus of beetles in the family Cerambycidae, containing the following species:

 Mimapomecyna biplagiatipennis Breuning, 1961
 Mimapomecyna flavostictica Breuning, 1957

References

Acanthocinini